Helia  is a genus of moths in the family Erebidae. The genus was erected by Jacob Hübner in 1818.

Species
 Helia agna (Druce, 1890)
 Helia albibasalis (Schaus, 1914)
 Helia argentipes (Walker, 1869) (syn: Helia digna (Felder and Rogenhofer, 1874))
 Helia bilunulalis (Walker, 1865) (syn: Helia yrias (Felder and Rogenhofer, 1874))
 Helia calligramma Hübner, 1818 (syn: Helia albirena (Walker, 1865), Helia amoena (Walker, 1865), Helia subnigra (Schaus, 1912))
 Helia carbonalis Guenée, 1854
 Helia celita (Schaus, 1912)
 Helia compacta (Felder and Rogenhofer, 1874)
 Helia cymansis Hampson, 1924
 Helia dentata (Walker, 1865)
 Helia erebea (Schaus, 1914)
 Helia exsiccata (Walker, 1858) (syn: Helia aezica (Druce, 1890), Helia caliginosa (Walker, 1865))
 Helia extranea (Walker, 1865) (syn: Helia dives (Walker, 1865), Helia frontalis (Walker, 1865))
 Helia hermelina (Guenée, 1852) (syn: Helia anguinea (Felder and Rogenhofer, 1874), Helia cruciata (Guenée, 1852), Helia diversa (Walker, 1865))
 Helia homopteridia (Schaus, 1912)
 Helia lampetia Druce, 1890
 Helia mollealis (Walker, 1858) (syn: Helia discalis (Walker, 1862))
 Helia serralis Mabille, 1880
 Helia subjuga (Dognin, 1912)
 Helia vitriluna (Guenée, 1852)

References

Omopterini
Moth genera